The Journal of Physical Chemistry A is a scientific journal which reports  research on the chemistry of molecules - including their dynamics, spectroscopy, kinetics, structure, bonding, and quantum chemistry. It is published weekly by the American Chemical Society.

Before 1997 the title was simply Journal of Physical Chemistry. Owing to the ever-growing amount of research in the area, in 1997 the journal was split into Journal of Physical Chemistry A (molecular theoretical and experimental physical chemistry) and The Journal of Physical Chemistry B (solid state, soft matter, liquids, etc.). Beginning in 2007, the latter underwent a further split, with The Journal of Physical Chemistry C now being dedicated to  nanotechnology, molecular electronics, and related subjects.

According to the Journal Citation Reports, the journal had an impact factor of 2.944 for 2021.

Editors-in-chief

1896–1932 Wilder Dwight Bancroft, Joseph E. Trevor
1933–1951 S. C. Lind
1952–1964 William A. Noyes
1965–1969 F. T. Wall
1970–1980 Bryce Crawford
1980–2004 Mostafa El-Sayed
2005–2019 George C. Schatz
2020–present Joan-Emma Shea

Popular culture
Sheldon Cooper, a fictional physicist from the television series The Big Bang Theory, appeared on the cover of a fictional issue of the journal.

See also 

 The Journal of Physical Chemistry B
 The Journal of Physical Chemistry C
 The Journal of Physical Chemistry Letters
 Russian Journal of Physical Chemistry A
 Russian Journal of Physical Chemistry B

External links

References

American Chemical Society academic journals
English-language journals
Physical chemistry journals
Weekly journals
Publications established in 1997